The 2001 European Junior Judo Championships is an edition of the European Junior Judo Championships, organised by the International Judo Federation. It was held in Budapest, Hungary from 16 to 18 November 2001.

Medal summary

Medal table

Men's events

Women's events

Source Results

References

External links
 

 U21
European Junior Judo Championships
European Championships, U21
Judo
European 2001
2001 in Hungarian sport
Judo, European Championships U21